Elekana was the first person to introduce Christianity to the Pacific islanders in what is now called Tuvalu. He was born in the Cook Islands in the 19th century, although the dates of his birth and death are unknown.

History
Christianity came to Tuvalu in 1861 when Elekana, a deacon of a Congregational church in Manihiki, Cook Islands, became caught in a storm and drifted for 8 weeks in a canoe before landing at Nukulaelae in the Ellice Islands on 10 May 1861.

Elekana began proselytising during the four months he spent on the atoll. He travelled to Funafuti where he also preached before returning to Samoa. He then trained at the London Missionary Society (LMS) Malua Theological College in Samoa before beginning his work in establishing the Church of Tuvalu. The "miraculous" drift voyage of Elekana was featured in the publications of the LMS.

Elekana, Ioane and Matatia, graduates of Malua Theological College, were appointed by the LMS to work in the Ellice Islands. Elekana and the other teachers started work in the Ellice Islands in 1865; travelling to the islands with the Revd. A. W. Murray of the LMS.

Monument 
The "Elekana Tuvalu-Christianity Memorial 1861" is a monument that is located on Nukulaelae atoll.

Sources
 Besnier, N., Literacy, Emotion and Authority: Reading and Writing on a Polynesian Atoll, (1995) Cambridge University Press 
 Besnier, N., Gossip and the Everyday Production of Politics, University of Hawaii Press (2009).
 Chambers, KS. & Chambers, A., Unity of Heart: Culture and Change in a Polynesian Atoll Society, (2001) Prospect Hts, Illinois: Waveland Press
 Goodall, N., A history of the London Missionary Society 1895–1945, London: Oxford University Press (1954).
 Goldsmith, M. & Munro, D., The Accidental Missionary: Tales of Elekana, Macmillan Brown Centre for Pacific Studies, University of Canterbury (1950).
 Kofe, L., Chapter 15, Palangi and Pastors, Tuvalu: A History (1983) Isala, Tito and Larcy, Hugh (eds.), Institute of Pacific Studies, University of the South Pacific and Government of Tuvalu.
 Luker, V. & Lal, BV. (editors) Telling Pacific Lives: Prisms of Process, ANU Press (2013).

References

Christianity in Tuvalu
History of Tuvalu
Cook Island Congregationalist missionaries
Christian missionaries in Tuvalu
19th-century Oceanian people
Protestant missionaries in the Cook Islands